Enameloid, also known as durodentine or vitrodentine, is an enamel-like tissue found in many fish. It is the primary outer component of shark odontodes (teeth and dermal denticles). Although the origin of enameloid is debated, it is probably homologous to dentine rather than true enamel, despite its enamel-like strength and development. The term covers any hyper-mineralized tissue with an organic "scaffold" consisting of ectodermal and ectomesenchymal proteins.

References 

Fish anatomy
Prehistoric fish